Standing Ovation is a 2010 American musical film written and directed by Stewart Raffill. Produced by Kenilworth Film Productions, Standing Ovation had a limited theatrical release on July 16, 2010.

During the promotion of Standing Ovation, the cast performed at venues across the US while traveling in a tour bus. Performances included a show before a crowd of 60,000 people at the Dallas Freedom Concert and an appearance on the main stage at Knott’s Berry Farm in California.

Standing Ovation premiered at Universal CityWalk which was attended by Barbra Streisand as well as James and Josh Brolin. After the film's opening, the cast of Standing Ovation performed a concert raising $60,000 for the children of the Ranfurly Home Orphanage in The Bahamas. The film was panned by critics.

Plot
Standing Ovation tells the story of "The 5 Ovations": five middle school friends who form a singing group to compete in a national music video contest. And much like Dorothy and her music-laden trip down the yellow brick road, the 5 Ovations encounter their own share of ups and downs, and showing up in many of the roadblocks are arch rivals The Wiggies. The group is composed of five talented sisters who will do anything to sabotage the Ovations' chances of competing for the grand prize of one million dollars. Armed with nothing but talent, passion and street smarts the 5 Ovations find something more valuable at the end of their quest: that perseverance, family, and friendship—plus a healthy dose of laughter—are instrumental in fulfilling your dreams.

Cast

 Kayla Jackson as Brittany O'Brien
 Alanna Palombo as Alanna Wannabe
 Pilar Martin as Blaze
 Kayla Raparelli as Cameron
 Najee Wilson as Maya
 Alexis Biesiada as Tatiana
 Joei DeCarlo as Joei Battaluci
 Rocco Fiorentino
 Bobby Harper as Mr. Wannabe 
 Austin Powell as Mark O'Brien
 P. Brendan Mulvey as Gramps
 William McKenna as Eric Bateman
 Brooke Feldman as Duet Girl
 Joann Reagan as Nursing Home Dance Captain
 Mario Macaluso as Kenny Rich
 Dexter Darden as MC John/"Diverse" Male Singing Group member
 Sal Dupree as Mr. Wiggs
 Jeana Zettler as Zoey Wiggs
 London Clark as Ziggy Wiggs
 Erika Corvette as Angel Wiggs
 Devon Jordan as Twiggy Wiggs
 Susie Newstadter as Ms. Wiggs
 Ashley Cutrona as Zita Wiggs
 Paula Tramutolo as Jasmine
 Mikey P. as Charity Dance Group member/'Dancing Girl' Rapper 
 Brian Jenkins as Charity Dance Group member
 Michael Henriquez as Charity Dance Group member
 Kristen Ferry as Charity Dance Group member
 Shawn Devries as charity dance group member
 Lexi Lukaszewski as background dancer with stunning personality

Soundtrack
The Standing Ovation soundtrack was released by Kenliworth Films on May 25, 2010 on AmazonMP3. On August 3, 2010, the album was released on iTunes and split into two CDs, one which features The Wiggies, and the other, featuring The 5 Ovations.

The film features a cover of River Deep - Mountain High originally by Tina Turner and Phil Spector as well as an original song titled Blush by Billboard hit songwriter and record producer Roy "Royalty" Hamilton III.

Award winning Composer/Producer, Edward B. Kessel, produced and wrote several of the songs on the Standing Ovation Soundtrack including Dancing Girls.

 Track List

 All I Wanna Do Is Sing - The 5 Ovations
 Scream - The 5 Ovations
 Blush - The Wiggies (produced by Roy "Royalty" Hamilton III)
 Thing 4 U - Diverse
 That Boy - The Wiggies
 Superstar - The Wiggies
 Crazy Feet - The 5 Ovations
 Soup to Nuts - Mr. Wiggs and The Wiggies
 The Runway (feat. Daade) - Dacav5 (produced by N Pa)
 The Music Is Dropping You (feat. Daade) - Dacav5 (produced by Daade)
 Dancing Girl - The Wiggies
 Shooting Star - The 5 Ovations
 Turn It Up - Mr. Wiggs
 Our Songs Begins Again - Jacklyne Tasca
 Standing Ovation - Austin Powell and Devon Jordan
 All I Wanna Do Is Sing (Single Mix) - Alexis Biesiada

Reception

Critical response
The film was panned by mainstream critics. On Rotten Tomatoes the film has 6% rating based on reviews from 17 critics. On Metacritic it has a score of 22 based on 6 reviews, indicating "Generally unfavorable reviews". Joe Leydon of Variety magazine called it “at once annoyingly hyper and underwhelmingly dull.” Mick LaSalle of the San Francisco Chronicle said "Standing Ovation is an innovative film in the sense that every minute or so it comes up with a different way of being annoying." Gary Thompson of Philadelphia Daily News said "Standing Ovation will have its work cut out for it at the viciously competitive box office, but the film may serve as a springboard for the eager and able talent on display.” The Last Airbender and Standing Ovation appear on the Worst of 2010 movie list by Ain’t It Cool News. Chris Hewitt of the St. Paul Pioneer Press said that he “had never heard of the people in Standing Ovation and I hope to never hear of any of them again.” On August 20, 2015, Crave Online declared the film the 37th Worst Movie of the Decade (So Far).

Standing Ovation received mixed reviews from family-centric critics. The Dove Foundation reviewed the film and gave it their Dove Seal of Approval for the family audience. Dove said “ This is a comical musical about a group of young singers and dancers as they try to make their dreams come true. It’s an upbeat film geared towards the tween set.” Roger Moore in Paradise Post said “Director Stewart Raffill (The New Swiss Family Robinson) is an old pro who at least makes the laughs work.” Scholastic News Magazine Kids Press Corps said “Standing Ovation is a rocking and colorful movie about musical competitions, friendship, loyalty, and dreams—BIG DREAMS!“

Some critics praised the cast for their performances. Carrie Rickey of The Philadelphia Inquirer said "the cast is full of fresh-faced unknowns ready for their close-ups. Most likely to succeed is Kayla Jackson, an almond-eyed dreamer". William Bibbiani of Geekscape says "Standing Ovation is a film that received a small theatrical run in the middle of the summer. You were probably too busy watching Inception to notice. The film was written and directed by Stewart Raffill, who also helmed the wonderful 1980s sci-fi action romp The Ice Pirates, and features a cast of dozens of youngsters competing in a music video contest..." "...in theaters around the country audiences are slowly beginning to discover Standing Ovation, one of the must-see movies of the year.” Jack Fitcher of the Cape May County Herald said “The movie is rich in dance numbers set to music that will be loved by teens and pre-teens which is the target audience. Even though this reporter is about 30 years older than the targeted demographic, I got caught up in the plot and enjoyed seeing so much local talent on the screen.”

Box office
The film was a box office bomb. The film had a limited release and earned a gross of $531,806 in the United States.

Home media
The film was released on DVD format as of November 29, 2010. On November 15, 2011, a companion DVD Standing Ovation Dance Party: Keep Fit! was released.

References

External links
 Official website
 
 

2010 films
American musical films
Films directed by Stewart Raffill
Films shot in New Jersey
2010s musical films
2010s English-language films
2010s American films